Joseph A. McArdle (June 29, 1903 – December 27, 1967) was a Democratic member of the U.S. House of Representatives from Pennsylvania.

McArdle was born in Muncie, Indiana. In 1905, he moved to Pittsburgh, Pennsylvania, with his parents, when his father, Peter J. McArdle was elected president of the Amalgamated Association of Iron and Steel Workers.  P.J. McArdle would go on to serve as a member of the Pittsburgh City Council from 1911–1913, 1916–1919, 1922–1930, and 1932–1940.

Joseph McArdle served in the Pennsylvania State House of Representatives from 1936–1938, when he was elected as a Democrat to the Seventy-sixth and Seventy-seventh Congresses and served until his resignation on January 5, 1942, to become a member of the Pittsburgh City Council.

He served as a Pittsburgh City Councilman until 1949. Also in 1949, he switched parties to turn Republican, and became the State GOP committeeman from Mount Washington, Pennsylvania, from early 1950 until 1966.

His grandson is actor Zachary Quinto, and their family story (focusing especially on P.J. McArdle) was featured on the 2022 series finale of the NBC television series Who Do You Think You Are?

Death
McArdle died in 1967, aged 64, and was interred at the Roman Catholic Calvary Cemetery, Pittsburgh, Pennsylvania.

Sources

The Political Graveyard

1903 births
1967 deaths
Burials at Calvary Catholic Cemetery (Pittsburgh)
Members of the Pennsylvania House of Representatives
People from Muncie, Indiana
Politicians from Pittsburgh
Pittsburgh City Council members
Pennsylvania Republicans
Democratic Party members of the United States House of Representatives from Pennsylvania
20th-century American politicians
Catholics from Pennsylvania
Catholics from Indiana